Pondy Bazaar, officially called Soundarapandianar Angadi, is a market and neighborhood located in T. Nagar, Chennai. It is one of the principal shopping districts of Chennai.

Etymology
The market ‘Soundarapandianar Bazaar' was named after Justice Party politician W. P. A. Soundarapandian Nadar whose statue is situated in the square. The police station in that area is officially called 'Soundarapandiyanar Angadi Kaval Nilayam'.

Transport
Theyagaraya Road, which is the arterial road of Pondy Bazaar, suffers from slow-moving traffic. To ease the traffic, the Metropolitan Transport Corporation (Chennai) has diverted buses going to the T. Nagar bus terminus that used to go via Pondy Bazaar. They now travel via the Thanikachalam Road-Burkit Road route. For some routes, such as the 47s and 11s, the buses occasionally go via Pondy Bazaar and occasionally via the diversion.

Private vehicles headed for the T. Nagar bus terminus or for Anna Salai (Saidapet and beyond) are strongly encouraged to either use the Thanikachalam Road route or Boag Road, rather than the Pondy Bazaar route, especially during rush hour.

Shopping district

Clothes, footwear, and mobiles accessories
Pondy Bazaar has a wide variety of clothing, accessories and footwear stores in all price ranges within a two or 3 km radius. It is a one stop destination for the multi-brand retail.

Along with independent retailers there are name brand stores such as Indian Terrain, Arrow Woodland, Bata, Fastrack, Titan, Mochi  Globus, Raymond Group, Reebok, Nike, Lee, Wrangler, Levi Strauss & Co. Health & Glow and Colour Plus along with cheaper outlets like Big Bazaar and Sri Krishna Collections. Popular clothing independent retailers include Instore, Naidu Hall and  MilanJyothi, amongst others. Mobile store chains Univercell and Poorvika are also present in Pondy Bazaar.

Commodities
Saravana Stores is one of the biggest commercial stores in Chennai. Commodities from safety pins to gold and diamond jewellery are available here. Rathna Stores has a big branch in Pondy Bazaar, where commodities ranging from umbrellas to cooking utensils are available at low prices. The shop has five floors. Ponni Stores. Rathna Fan House (not to be confused with Rathna Stores) is a place for electrical accessories such as fans, air conditioners, and refrigerators. Formerly specialised in lingerie, Naidu Hall now offers garments of all types.

Roadside vendors
Many commodities such as used books, buckets, ropes, soap cases, hair bands, bangles, bags, and other accessories are available from roadside vendors at Pondy Bazaar. These roadside shops form the chief attraction of Pondy bazaar.  Most of the commodities in the roadside shops have no fixed price and so the customers and vendors can often be seen bargaining.  On weekends the pavements on either side of which the shops are located are crowded.  The roadside shops bring in the new fashions of Chennai accessories.
e4

Restaurants
Some of the popular restaurants in and around Pondy Bazaar are Saravana Bhavan, Balaajee Bhavan, Geetha's Cafe, Hot Chips, Adyar Anandha bhavan, Hotel woodlands, Anjjapar & Bombay Halwa House,  (Veg. Punjabi food).

Ambica Apppalam Depot which stocks wide varieties of Masalas and Appalams (Papads) is also located in a street perpendicular to Pondy Bazaar.

Hotels
At the eastern edge of Pondy Bazaar, two major star hotels are located: Grand Chennai by GRT Hotels and Residency Towers.

Temples
Tirumala Tirupati Devastanam, located near Venkatnaraya Road (T. Nagar), is a temple of Lord Balaji. Mupathamman Temple, located near Duraiswamy Bridge, is a temple for Mariamman.

Schools
Ramakrishan Mission School and a hostel are opposite Panagal Park and near the T. Nagar bus stand and Habibullah Road. Holy Angels Girls School is nearby. Shrine Vailankanni Senior Secondary School is a school on Dhandapani Street, with classes from lkg to eleventh standard.

See also

References

Bazaars
Bazaars in India
Retail markets in Chennai
Retailing in Chennai
Shopping districts and streets in India